Porky in the North Woods is a Warner Brothers Looney Tunes short animated film directed by Frank Tashlin. The short was released on December 19, 1936, and stars Porky Pig.

Home media
Porky in the North Woods was released on the Looney Tunes Golden Collection: Volume 4.

References

External links
 Porky in the North Woods at IMDB

Short films directed by Frank Tashlin
1936 films
1936 animated films
Looney Tunes shorts
Warner Bros. Cartoons animated short films
1936 comedy films
Films scored by Carl Stalling
American black-and-white films
1930s Warner Bros. animated short films
Porky Pig films